The 2007 Berlin Thunder season was the ninth and final season for the franchise in the NFL Europa League (NFLEL). The team was led by head coach John Allen in his first year, and played its home games at Olympic Stadium in Berlin, Germany. They finished the regular season in sixth place with a record of two wins and eight losses. The National Football League (NFL) announced the closure of its European branch on June 29.

Offseason

Free agent draft

Personnel

Staff

Roster

Schedule

Standings

Game summaries

Week 1: at Rhein Fire

Week 2: vs Hamburg Sea Devils

Week 3: vs Amsterdam Admirals

Week 4: at Cologne Centurions

Week 5: vs Cologne Centurions

Week 6: at Frankfurt Galaxy

Week 7: at Hamburg Sea Devils

Week 8: vs Frankfurt Galaxy

Week 9: vs Rhein Fire

Week 10: at Amsterdam Admirals

Honors
Chris Barclay, Special Teams Player of the Week (Week 4)
Carlton Brewster, All-NFL Europa League team selection
Andrew Jacas, Special Teams Player of the Week (Week 1)
Chris Thompson, Defensive Player of the Week (Week 10)

Notes

References

Berlin
Berlin Thunder seasons